Mohammad Rezam Baskoro (born July 24, 1996) is an Indonesian professional footballer who plays for Liga 1 club Persis Solo as a winger.

Club career

Celebest
He was signed for Celebest to play in Liga 2 in the 2017 season.

Bandung United
In 2019, Rezam Baskoro signed a year contract with Bandung United from Celebest. Rezam scored 10 goals in the 2019 season, when Bandung United played in the second division. He finished the season scoring in total 10 league goals and became third highest top goalscorer in 2019 Liga 2.

Persiraja
For 2020 season, he joined Persiraja to compete in Liga 1.

Persis Solo
In 2021, Rezam Baskoro signed a contract with Indonesian Liga 2 club Persis Solo.

References

External links
 Rezam Baskoro at Liga Indonesia
 Rezam Baskoro at Soccerway

1996 births
Living people
Indonesian footballers
Association football forwards
Persiraja Banda Aceh players
People from Palu
Sportspeople from Central Sulawesi